Vanna Vanna Pookkal is a 1992 Indian Tamil-language romantic drama film, directed by Balu Mahendra, starring Prashanth, Mounika and Vinodhini. The film, produced by Kalaipuli S. Thanu, was released on 15 January 1992, and won the National Film Award for Best Feature Film in Tamil at the 39th National Film Awards. The film completed a hundred-day run at the box-office.

Plot 

After saving Manoranjitham from killing herself in the forest, the kindhearted Siva brings her home to live in his house, much to the despair of his neighbor Shenbagam, who secretly loves him. Things become even more complicated when Siva falls in love with his houseguest and arranges for them to be married, but on the day of the wedding, she mysteriously disappears. Siva learns that Manoranjitham is going to die because of her serious health conditions. He finally finds her at her deathbed in the hospital where she dies. The film ends with Shenbagam comforting a grieving Siva.

Cast 

Prashanth as Siva (Sivasubramani)
Mounika as Shenbagam
Vinodhini as Manoranjitham
Dubbing Janaki as Sivagami, Shenbagam's mother
T. K. S. Chandran as Shenbagam's father
Veeraraghavan as Manoranjitham's father
Vaani as Manoranjitham's mother
Radhabhai as Shenbagam's grandmother
Adithya as Azhagiri
Vijay
Azhagu
Suresh Chakravarthi
Manavalan
Suryakanthammal
Indhu
Sakunthala

Soundtrack 
The soundtrack was composed by Ilaiyaraaja, with lyrics written by himself, Vaali and Gangai Amaran. For the dubbed Telugu version Prema Paatam, all songs were written by Rajasri.

Release and reception 
Vanna Vanna Pookkal was released on 15 January 1992. C. R. K. of Kalki appreciated the film for the cinematography and music. The film completed a hundred-day run at the box-office, and won the National Film Award for Best Feature Film in Tamil.

References

External links 
 
 

1990s Tamil-language films
1992 films
1992 romantic drama films
Best Tamil Feature Film National Film Award winners
Films directed by Balu Mahendra
Films scored by Ilaiyaraaja
Indian romantic drama films